Éder Richartz (born 7 October 1981) is a retired Brazilian footballer.

Career statistics

Club

Notes

References

1981 births
Living people
Brazilian footballers
Brazilian expatriate footballers
Association football midfielders
Avaí FC players
Clube Atlético Metropolitano players
Coritiba Foot Ball Club players
Associação Naval 1º de Maio players
Esporte Clube São Bento players
ABC Futebol Clube players
Associação Chapecoense de Futebol players
Esporte Clube Noroeste players
Associação Desportiva Confiança players
Free State Stars F.C. players
Guarani de Palhoça players
Hà Nội FC (1956) players
Clube Esportivo Aimoré players
Associação Atlética Coruripe players
Liga Portugal 2 players
Primeira Liga players
South African Premier Division players
Brazilian expatriate sportspeople in Portugal
Expatriate footballers in Portugal
Brazilian expatriate sportspeople in South Africa
Expatriate soccer players in South Africa
Brazilian expatriate sportspeople in Vietnam
Expatriate footballers in Vietnam
Sportspeople from Florianópolis